Ugo Crousillat ( (born 27 October 1990) is a water polo player from France. He was part of the French team at the 2016 Summer Olympics, where the team was eliminated in the group stage.
Before French, he was a member of Montenegro's national team. So far, his biggest international achievement was 2nd place on European Water Polo Championship held in Eindhoven 2013.

See also
 List of World Aquatics Championships medalists in water polo

References

External links
 

French male water polo players
Living people
1990 births
Water polo players from Marseille
Olympic water polo players of France
Water polo players at the 2016 Summer Olympics
Competitors at the 2018 Mediterranean Games
Mediterranean Games competitors for France